The Brisbane Lions' 2000 season was its fourth season in the Australian Football League (AFL).

Season summary

Premiership Season

Home and away season

Finals series

Ladder

References

Brisbane Lions season, 2000
Brisbane Lions seasons